Julian Feoli-Gudino (born June 22, 1987) is a Costa Rican professional Canadian football wide receiver for the Winnipeg Blue Bombers of the Canadian Football League (CFL). He was originally drafted by Toronto Argonauts, where he won his first Grey Cup championship in 2012. He played CIS football for the Laval Rouge et Or. He has also played for the Ottawa Redblacks.

Professional career

Toronto Argonauts 
Feoli-Gudino was drafted 38th overall by the Toronto Argonauts in the 2011 CFL Draft, but he elected to play out his final year of college eligibility at Laval. Following the 2011 CIS football season, Feoli-Gudino signed with Argonauts on January 11, 2012.

Winnipeg Blue Bombers 
Feoli-Gudino signed with the Winnipeg Blue Bombers on January 21, 2014. He spent four years with the Blue Bombers, playing in 63 games and recording 111 catches for 1105 yards and seven touchdowns.

Ottawa Redblacks 
Upon entering free agency, Feoli-Gudino signed with the Ottawa Redblacks to a one-year contract on February 14, 2018. Julian Feoli-Gudino had 11 receptions for 200 yards with two touchdowns in his first season with the Redblacks. Following the season he agreed to a one-year contract extension. In 2019, he played in eight games and recorded 13 receptions for 119 yards before he was released on August 12, 2019.

Winnipeg Blue Bombers (II) 
On February 5, 2020, Feoli-Gudino signed with the defending Grey Cup champion Winnipeg Blue Bombers for the second time in his career.

References

External links
Winnipeg Blue Bombers bio

1987 births
Living people
Canadian football wide receivers
Sportspeople from San José, Costa Rica
Players of Canadian football from Quebec
Laval Rouge et Or football players
Toronto Argonauts players
Winnipeg Blue Bombers players
Ottawa Redblacks players